Peter Davies (born 8 March 1936) was a Welsh former professional footballer who played as a wing half. He made 140 appearances in the Football League for Swansea Town and Brighton & Hove Albion. He began his career with Llanelly in the Southern League before joining Arsenal. After two years and no appearances, he returned Wales with Swansea Town where he spent six seasons. After brief spells with Brighton & Hove Albion and Merthyr Tydfil, he went to South Africa to play for Germiston Callies where he then got injured and was forced to retire.

References 

1936 births
Footballers from Llanelli
Living people
Welsh footballers
Association football wing halves
Llanelli Town A.F.C. players
Arsenal F.C. players
Swansea City A.F.C. players
Brighton & Hove Albion F.C. players
Merthyr Tydfil F.C. players
Germiston Callies F.C. players
Southern Football League players
English Football League players
National Football League (South Africa) players